ZooPhobia is an American webcomic originally published in 2012 by Vivienne Medrano, from which she later loosely adapted characters and plotlines for her animated web and television series Hazbin Hotel and Helluva Boss. It follows a young woman named Cameron who travels to an interspecies sanctuary named Safe Haven.

Plot 
Cameron, a neurotic young woman, is sent to an island sanctuary named Safe Haven by accident after she desperately pleas for a counseling job. She discovers that she cannot leave the island, or else it would lose its magic. She spends the duration of the comic trying to lessen her fear of the animals (zoophobia) in Safe Haven, trying to adapt to the unfamiliar environment she was thrown into.

Characters 
Alastor, a deer demon who was later removed from ZooPhobia to be placed in Hazbin Hotel.
Angel Dust, a spider demon who was later removed from ZooPhobia to be placed in Hazbin Hotel.
Autumn, a deer who often quarrels with Rusty.
Cameron ("Cam"), a human woman who came to Safe Haven by accident. She is zoophobic, with her fear of animals making it difficult for her to integrate herself into the society of Safe Haven. She is the guidance counselor at Zoo Phoenix Academy (ZPA).
Damian, demon and mischievous son of Lucifer.
 Jack, a superstitious jackal who is cursed with bad luck for eternity, and who is unable to die. Most people avoid him, fearing they will be hurt by his bad luck, but he has a small group of friends.
JayJay ("JJ", "JiJi", "Blue Jay"), a party-loving werewolf girl.
 Kayla, a theater-loving kangaroo, student at ZPA, and the girlfriend of Zill.
Lucifer, leader of the underworld and father of Damian.
Nightengale, a member of JayJay's werewolf party posse.
Raven, a member of JayJay's werewolf party posse.
Reuben ("Rusty"), a stereotypical bully and a dog.
Robin, a member of JayJay's werewolf party posse.
Spam, a music-loving fox.
Vaggie, a demon who was later removed from ZooPhobia to be placed in Hazbin Hotel.
Vanexa, a pessimistic purple cat.
 Zill, an animal of unknown origins. Zill is kind and friendly to many, including his best friend, Jack. He is dating Kayla.

Release
Although the comic was originally released in 2012, Medrano mentioned creating a webcomic in December 2010. The comic went on hiatus for an indefinite period in November 2016, reportedly because Medrano wanted to focus on developing Hazbin Hotel into an animated series. In April 2017, Medrano said the comic would get a "complete reboot", and hinted at the same in a July 2018 Tumblr post.

Animated short 
On September 30, 2020, Medrano released a 12-minute animated short on her YouTube channel, titled "Bad Luck Jack". It was funded by crowdfunding from her Patreon. The short featured various characters from the webcomic and music by Gooseworx. Medrano said the animated short was "very special" to her. Two songs in the short, "Make a Start" and "The Curse" were written by Sam Haft, while Parry Gripp wrote the song "Monster Fighting Time". Bryson Baugus voiced Jack, Joe Zieja voiced Zill, Reba Buhr voiced Kayla, and Cristina Vee provided Kayla's singing voice. The short was co-written by Medrano and Amanda Heard.

Reception 
Larry Cruz of CBR compared the journey of the protagonist, Cameron, to Charlotte Brontë's Jane Eyre. Cruz also praised Medrano's artistic style as "visually appealing", calling it unconventional like a "John Kricfalusi cartoon" and called the storytelling "decent". He also criticized the story of Cameron overcoming her intense fear of animals to be "a little rushed", and said that the designs of the animal characters were too similar to each other. Asher Wolf of the Furry Times called the webcomic unique, adding that "whether you think it is good depends on your taste", praised the artistic style, and argued that the storyline is "out there", making it a comic you will either "love or hate".

Dan Short of Animated Views differentiated the animated short, "Bad Luck Jack", from Medrano's other works, saying that it is "equivalent to a Disney Channel program like High School Musical" because it is "wholesome, super tame, contains no sexual references, and has no profanity", making it family-friendly. Short also wrote that the short is visually appealing, and could serve as an introduction to those not familiar with the series. He stated that Kayla stands out because of her Australian accent, and praised the voice cast and musical numbers. Short concluded by calling the short "perfectly enjoyable".

Awards
The animated short "Bad Luck Jack" won a Ursa Major Award in the "Best Dramatic Short Work" category in 2020. The Ursa Major awards are given in the field of furry fandom works and are the main awards in the field of anthropomorphism. The short was also listed as a "Recommended Anthropomorphic Dramatic Short Work" on the Ursa Major Award website.

References

External links 
 Official website

2012 webcomic debuts
2016 webcomic endings
American webcomics
Fantasy webcomics
Furry webcomics
Comedy webcomics
Horror webcomics
LGBT-related webcomics
School webcomics